The Morris Hill Cemetery Mausoleum in Boise, Idaho, was designed by Tourtellotte & Hummel and constructed in 1937. The Art Deco, reinforced concrete building includes stained glass windows at the end of each wing, and a central stained glass window is across from a single, bronze door entry. The mausoleum was added to the National Register of Historic Places in 1982.

The mausoleum is managed by Boise Parks and Recreation. It was constructed after a successful public offering of subscription sales promoted by George D. Mason of Glendale, California. The mausoleum was dedicated by Frank A. Rhea in 1938.

Notable internments

See also
 John Green Mausoleum
 Joseph Kinney Mausoleum
 National Register of Historic Places listings in Ada County, Idaho

References

External links
 
 Morris Hill Cemetery website

National Register of Historic Places in Boise, Idaho
Art Deco architecture in Idaho
Buildings and structures completed in 1937
Mausoleums on the National Register of Historic Places
Tourtellotte & Hummel buildings
1937 establishments in Idaho
Death in Idaho